István Beé (born 4 July 1972, in Budapest) is a Hungarian sprint canoer who competed from the mid-1990s to the late 2000s. He won eight medals at the ICF Canoe Sprint World Championships with five golds (K-4 200 m: 1998, 1999, 2001, 2005, 2007), a silver (K-4 200 m: 2006), and two bronzes (K-2 1000 m: 1994, K-4 200 m: 2002).

Beé also competed in two Summer Olympics, earning his best finish of fifth in the K-4 1000 m event at Beijing in 2008.

He is a member of the Budapest Honvéd FC club. He is 185 cm (6'1") tall and weighs 87 kg (191 lbs).

References

1972 births
Budapest Honvéd FC canoers
Canoeists at the 2004 Summer Olympics
Canoeists at the 2008 Summer Olympics
Hungarian male canoeists
Living people
Olympic canoeists of Hungary
ICF Canoe Sprint World Championships medalists in kayak
Canoeists from Budapest
21st-century Hungarian people